Poss Mountain is a prominent 6,180-foot (1,880 meter) mountain summit located in the Philip Smith Mountains of the Brooks Range, in the U.S. state of Alaska. The peak was named about 1930 by wilderness activist Robert Marshall after "Poss" Postlethwaite, an early and old gold prospector in this area around Wiseman. Robert Marshall described the then 78-year-old Postlethwaite as "the oldest man in the Koyukuk," having spent 32 winters in the area. The name was officially adopted in 1932 by the U.S. Board on Geographic Names. The Poss Mountain Research Natural Area (8,042 acres) was designated in 1991 to protect natural mineral licks and lambing habitat for Dall sheep. Precipitation runoff from the mountain drains into tributaries of the Middle and South Forks of Koyukuk River.

Climate

Based on the Köppen climate classification, Poss Mountain is located in a subarctic climate zone with long, cold, winters, and short, cool summers. Temperatures can drop below −30 °C with wind chill factors below −50 °C. The months June through August offer the most favorable weather for viewing and climbing.

See also

List of mountain peaks of Alaska
Geography of Alaska

References

External links

 Weather forecast: Poss Mountain
 Photos of Poss Postlethwaite on pages 146 and 147

Mountains of Alaska
Landforms of Yukon–Koyukuk Census Area, Alaska
Brooks Range
North American 1000 m summits